Úmonín is a municipality and village in Kutná Hora District in the Central Bohemian Region of the Czech Republic. It has about 500 inhabitants.

Administrative parts
Villages of Březová, Hájek, Korotice, Lomec and Lomeček are administrative parts of Úmonín.

Notable people
Lawrence of Březová (c. 1370 – c. 1437), historian and writer
Lata Brandisová (1895–1981), aristocrat and equestrian

References

Villages in Kutná Hora District